Fyra Bugg & en Coca Cola och andra hits is a 2003 compilation album by Lotta Engberg.

Track listing
Vem é dé du vill ha
Juliette & Jonathan
Åh vad jag älskade dig just då
Klia mig på ryggen
Hela världen öppnar sig
Sångerna som för oss tätt tillsammans
Fyra Bugg & en Coca Cola
Orientexpressen
Jag vandrar i ett regn
Hey Hey Lady Hey
Vi kan drömma
Dom vill bara väl
Succéshottis
Brevet från Maria på Öland
Jag vill bara vá en människa av i dag
Nicolaj
Håll om mej i natt
Ditt monopol
Hit-parad

References

2003 compilation albums
Lotta Engberg albums